Carex picta is a tussock-forming species of perennial sedge in the family Cyperaceae. It is native to south western parts of North America.

See also
List of Carex species

References

picta
Plants described in 1855
Taxa named by Ernst Gottlieb von Steudel
Flora of Mississippi
Flora of Tennessee
Flora of Alabama
Flora of Indiana
Flora of Louisiana
Flora of Kentucky